Sandymount Avenue joins Merrion Road to Gilford Road in Sandymount, Dublin. Sandymount railway station is located roughly halfway along it at a level crossing. It is a residential area.

W.B. Yeats, the Nobel Prize-winning poet, was born here. A plaque now marks his birthplace.

See also

List of streets and squares in Dublin

References

Streets in Dublin (city)
Sandymount